Opharus conspicuus is a moth of the family Erebidae. It was described by Herbert Druce in 1906. It is found in Peru.

References

Opharus
Moths described in 1906
Moths of South America